Coronet is an American typeface designed in 1937 by R. Hunter Middleton.

Uses in popular culture
 Andy Warhol's "signature" on the cover of Velvet Underground and Nico is done in this font.
 Some of the credits for I Love Lucy were in this font; it was also the typeface used for the Desilu closing ident seen on The Lucy Show and the original Star Trek series.
 It was used for the Newlyweds: Nick & Jessica logo.
 Deftones uses Ribbon 131, Bitstream's digitisation of Coronet, on some of their albums.
Billie Eilish's Happier than Ever uses Coronet for its cover text and associated branding.

References

Script typefaces
Letterpress typefaces
Typefaces and fonts introduced in 1937
Typefaces designed by R. Hunter Middleton